William Stead may refer to:

 Bill Stead (1887–1939), English football goalkeeper with Southampton, Aberdeen and Clapton Orient
 W. T. Stead (William Thomas Stead, 1849–1912), English journalist, victim of RMS Titanic disaster
 William Force Stead (1884–1967), American diplomat, poet, Anglican clergyman
 William Stead (rugby league), rugby league footballer of the 1930s and 1940s
 William H. Stead, American politician and lawyer
 Billy Stead, New Zealand rugby union player